Roberto Casares (born 14 July 1964) is a Spanish table tennis player. He competed in the men's singles event at the 1992 Summer Olympics.

References

1964 births
Living people
Spanish male table tennis players
Olympic table tennis players of Spain
Table tennis players at the 1992 Summer Olympics
Place of birth missing (living people)